"Billy the Kid" is a song co-written and recorded by American country music singer Billy Dean. It was released in May 1992 as the third single from his 1991 album Billy Dean. The song spent twenty weeks on the Hot Country Songs chart in 1992, peaking at number four.  The song was written by Dean and Paul Nelson.

Music video
The music video was directed by Bill Young and premiered in May 1992. At the beginning, the music from Dean's previous song, "Only the Wind" is heard.

Chart positions
"Billy the Kid" debuted at number 60 on the U.S. Billboard Hot Country Singles & Tracks for the week of May 23, 1992.

Year-end charts

References

1991 songs
1992 singles
Billy Dean songs
Capitol Records Nashville singles
Songs written by Billy Dean
Songs written by Paul Nelson (songwriter)
Song recordings produced by Tom Shapiro